This is a list detailing the electoral history of the American Independent and American Parties, sorted by year. While initially a single party, a schism occurred between factions that sought either to expand the party's influence beyond into the North, and those that sought to concentrate largely within the Deep South. Though they were by 1976 established as two parties, it remains difficult to ascertain which candidates were loyal to which faction, and so they have been collected for the sake of simplicity into a single list.

The list only consists of those candidates who ran for partisan office.

Federal Elections

Presidential Tickets

Presidential Nominating Conventions

Presidential Primaries

Senatorial Elections

Senate Class I

Senate Class II

Senate Class III

References

American Independent Party